Cheshire Oaks may refer to:

 Cheshire Oaks (horse race), a horse race run at Chester Racecourse
 Cheshire Oaks Designer Outlet, an outlet centre at Ellesmere Port in England
 Cheshire Oaks Arena, a stadium at Ellesmere Port